Franco Pellizotti (born 15 January 1978) is an Italian former professional road bicycle racer, who rode professionally between 2001 and 2018 for the Alessio,  and  teams. Pellizotti now works as a directeur sportif for the  team.

Career
Pellizotti was born in Latisana, Udine, Friuli-Venezia Giulia. During his career, Pellizotti was known as a climbing specialist and won Stage 10 in the 2006 Giro d'Italia, Stage 16 in the 2008 Giro d'Italia and Stage 17 in the 2009 Giro d'Italia. After finishing third overall in the 2009 Giro, he won the polka dot jersey in Paris as the best climber of the 2009 Tour de France (which has been cancelled), as well as named the Most Combative (Aggressive) Rider on Stages 9 and 17. At the start of each race, Pellizotti was seen making the sign of the cross and kissing a crucifix around his neck.

Doping
On 3 May 2010, Pellizotti's name was released by La Gazzetta dello Sport as being one of several riders under investigation by the Union Cycliste Internationale (UCI) for "irregular blood values". Pellizotti was reported to have had "suspicious values" on the eve of the 2009 Tour de France and request has been made by the UCI for investigation. This was confirmed later that day in a UCI press release. He was due to be one of ' team leaders at the 2010 Giro d'Italia, but was immediately pulled from the squad and replaced with Vincenzo Nibali. His team said they have faith in the explanation put forward by Pellizotti and are conducting a further investigation. Shortly after the end of the season, the suspension was lifted on the grounds of lack of evidence, and Pellizotti declared a wish to seek financial redress from the UCI.  declined to re-sign Pellizotti after the 2010 season. Pellizotti's case reached the Court of Arbitration for Sport in March 2011. After asking the court for a speedy verdict, he was suspended for two years after it upheld the UCI's appeal. His ban lasted until May 2012. The Court also annulled all results from 17 May 2009, meaning that Pellizotti lost a stage win and third place overall in the Giro d'Italia and a stage win and overall victory in the mountains and combativity classifications in the Tour de France.

Following the conclusion of his ban, Pellizotti signed with the  team.

However, Pellizotti would have only been able to compete from May 2014 due to  being a member of the Mouvement pour un cyclisme crédible (MPCC), and that Pellizotti had previously served a two-year ban for a UCI biological passport violation.

Major results

2000
 2nd Overall Giro Ciclistico d'Italia
1st Stage 6
 2nd Gran Premio Palio del Recioto
 2nd Trofeo Alcide Degasperi
 3rd Trofeo Zsšdi
 5th Overall Grand Prix Guillaume Tell
2001
 1st Points classification Tour of Austria
 8th Giro di Campania
 10th Overall Deutschland Tour
 10th Giro dell'Appennino
2002
 1st Giro del Friuli
 1st Stage 4 Tour of the Basque Country
 1st Stage 5 Tour de Pologne
 5th Trofeo Melinda
 6th Giro dell'Emilia
 9th Overall Tirreno–Adriatico
1st Stage 6
2003
 3rd Overall Settimana Internazionale di Coppi e Bartali
 6th Trofeo Melinda
 8th Overall Giro d'Italia
2004
 1st Gran Premio di Chiasso
 2nd Giro del Friuli
 2nd Coppa Sabatini
 3rd Overall Tour de Pologne
 5th Giro del Veneto
 6th Giro dell'Emilia
 7th Overall Settimana Internazionale di Coppi e Bartali
 9th Giro di Lombardia
2005
 1st  Overall Settimana Internazionale di Coppi e Bartali
1st Stage 2
 2nd Trofeo Laigueglia
 2nd Gran Premio Città di Camaiore
 3rd Overall Tour Méditerranéen
 4th Overall Volta a la Comunitat Valenciana
 6th Overall Paris–Nice
 8th Giro del Veneto
 9th Milan–San Remo
2006
 2nd Milano–Torino
 3rd GP Industria & Artigianato di Larciano
 3rd Coppa Ugo Agostoni
 5th Gran Premio Nobili Rubinetterie
 7th Trofeo Sóller
 8th Overall Giro d'Italia
1st Stage 10
 10th Clásica de San Sebastián
2007
 1st Memorial Marco Pantani
 2nd GP Industria & Artigianato di Larciano
 5th Overall Paris–Nice
1st  Points classification
1st Stage 3
 5th Overall Giro del Trentino
 6th Giro di Toscana
 9th Overall Tour of California
 9th Overall Giro d'Italia
1st Stage 1 (TTT)
2008
 2nd Overall Tour of Slovenia
 3rd Overall Tour de Pologne
 3rd Giro d'Oro
 4th Overall Giro d'Italia
1st Stage 16 (ITT)
 5th Clásica de San Sebastián
2009
 7th GP Industria & Artigianato di Larciano

2009
Tour de France
1st  Mountains classification
 Combativity award Overall
 3rd Overall Giro d'Italia
1st Stage 17
2010
3rd GP Industria & Artigianato di Larciano

2012
 1st  Road race, National Road Championships
 3rd Overall Giro di Padania
 3rd Gran Premio Città di Camaiore
 3rd Giro dell'Emilia
 4th Overall Vuelta a Burgos
 5th Trofeo Melinda
 5th Circuito de Getxo
 9th Gran Premio Nobili Rubinetterie
 10th Milano–Torino
2013
 2nd Overall Route du Sud
 4th Overall Settimana Ciclistica Lombarda
 4th Coppa Sabatini
 4th Giro dell'Emilia
 5th Gran Premio Industria e Commercio di Prato
 6th GP Industria & Artigianato di Larciano
 6th Tre Valli Varesine
 8th Giro di Lombardia
 8th Coppa Ugo Agostoni
 10th Milano–Torino
2014
 3rd Coppa Sabatini
 3rd Giro dell'Emilia
 6th Overall Settimana Internazionale di Coppi e Bartali
 9th Overall Giro del Trentino
 10th Trofeo Laigueglia
2015
 4th Giro dell'Appennino
 6th Gran Premio di Lugano
 7th Overall Settimana Internazionale di Coppi e Bartali
 7th Giro dell'Emilia
 9th Overall Herald Sun Tour
2016
 7th Coppa Sabatini
 10th Overall Tour of Slovenia
2018
 6th Memorial Marco Pantani

Grand Tour general classification results timeline

References

External links

1978 births
Doping cases in cycling
Italian sportspeople in doping cases
Living people
People from Latisana
Cyclists at the 2008 Summer Olympics
Italian Giro d'Italia stage winners
Italian male cyclists
Olympic cyclists of Italy
Cyclists from Friuli Venezia Giulia
Directeur sportifs